Dharshan Thavaraja (born on 7 January 1994) is a portrait artist and an actor in Sri Lankan Television. Dharshan started his career as a TV Presenter and a  model. He started his journey from the Tamil entertainment industry in Sri Lanka and later started acting in Sinhala Teledramas.

Personal life 
Dharshan Thavaraja was born on 7 January 1994. He has an elder sister. His mother’s name is Shanmugam Chithrakala. He studied in Vivekananda College, Colombo. Later he joined an art school in India to master Painting

When he was a kid, he used to imitate his relatives and family friends' behaviors, in front of his family members. From the beginning his family always motivates him to continue what he is passionate about. Dharshan as a teenager, always wanted to dress nice and smart even when he did not have enough money, once he mentioned that his grandmother always supported fulfilling his great desires.

Acting career 
Dharshan started his career in Tamil Entertainment industry while he was working as a Television presenter and moved to Sinhala Television industry in 2021. As per him he has not received enough appreciations and encouragement from his Tamil audience. Therefore, he had to decide whether he should move to Sinhala Television industry which is the major entertainment stream in Sri Lanka or to seek for opportunities in Indian Film Industry. Dharshan prefers Villain or Action hero roles in his career.

Dharshan is acting in Hithuwakkara and Sidu 2 – Shakthi Sinahala Tele Series.  He acted in Rudhraraksha and 7K Tamil Tele Series.

Teledramas/Series

Movies

Beyond Acting 
Dharshan started painting as a business after completing his Secondary education. He was planning to join Cabin crew after completing his Advanced Level as he is eager to Travel. Meanwhile he was offered with a job as a Television presenter. He continued his career as a TV presenter and aProduction assistant in Shakthi TV for 8 years and left the organization in 2021 to start his career as a professional actor.

Dharshan started as a Model (person) with a brand called FOA. Lately he worked with Emerald, Deedat, Fashion bug.

Dharshan released his first Song Deepavali Ra with Torana Music in October, 2022.

References

1994 births
Living people
Sri Lankan Tamil actors
Sri Lankan male television actors
Sri Lankan male models
Sri Lankan television presenters
Portrait artists